Cabela's Outdoor Adventures is a hunting video game released in 2005 by Activision.

Gameplay 
The game gives a player the ability to drive vehicles, fish, and hunt. There are 11 locations, 32 animals to hunt and harvest, and several thousand Cabela's gear options. Some of the animals in the game include white-tailed deer, mule deer, brown bear, black bear, moose, coyote, bobcat, lynx, javelina, and raccoon. There are animals in the game that will attack you including bobcats, wolves, bears, lynx, coyotes, and moose.

Open Season allows to go right into the hunt with random gear in order to complete the authorized bag limit for deer. The players can also choose the difficulty of the hunt to test out the capabilities. They include Greenhorn (Easy), Sportsmen (Medium), and Simulation (Hard).

Reception 
The game received mostly positive reviews from critics, who praised it for its gameplay, graphics, sound, value, and animal behaviors, but it was criticized for the human designs and movements.

References 

2005 video games
Action video games
Activision games
Cabela's video games
GameCube games
PlayStation 2 games
Video games developed in Romania
Windows games
Xbox games
Fun Labs games
Single-player video games
Sand Grain Studios games
Magic Wand Productions games